Kalervo Oberg (January 15, 1901 – July 11,1973) was a Canadian anthropologist. Oberg was dedicated to fieldwork, serving as a civil servant and a teacher. He travelled the world and wrote about these experiences so others could enjoy them as well. Oberg is perhaps best known for applying the term culture shock to all people who travel abroad into new cultures and for his doctoral dissertation, The Social Economy of the Tlingit Indians of Alaska.

Early life
Oberg was born to Finnish parents in Nanaimo, British Columbia in 1901. His family moved to Sointula, British Columbia, when Oberg was very young, but the collapse of the settlement forced his family to leave.

Education
Oberg earned a bachelor's degree in economics from the University of British Columbia, attended the University of Pittsburgh, where he earned a master's degree in economics, and earned his doctorate from University of Chicago which linked economics and the social organization among the Tlingit, an Alaskan Native tribe.

Culture shock
Oberg continued to spend much of his time in the United States, teaching in university systems in both Missouri and Montana, and became a U.S. citizen in 1944. Along with teaching in the United States, Oberg spent time both as a student and teacher in foreign countries. He attended the London School of Economics during two different periods in the 1930s.

While in São Paulo, he taught at the Free School of Sociology and Political Science, however didn't obtain a permanent position.  Oberg then worked in various government postings overseas, including the Institute of Inter-American Affairs, a forerunner of the U.S. Agency for International Development, with assignments including Ecuador, Peru, Brazil, and Surinam.  After his employment with the government, Oberg found teaching positions at Cornell, the University of Southern California, and also Oregon State University, on a part-time basis late in his career.

Oberg gave a talk to the Women's Club of Rio de Janeiro on August 3, 1954, explaining feelings common to those facing their first cross-cultural experience. In so doing, he identified 4 stages of culture shock which continue to be commonly used, for example in Winkleman's stages of cultural adaptation. Bobbs-Merrill published Oberg's talk later in 1954 and it was then republished in Practical Anthropology (7:177-182) in 1960.  The June 1974 American Anthropologist 76(2):356-360 published an obituary for Oberg.

References

External links 
 Kalervo Oberg - biography
 2001 Kalervo Oberg Memorial Award - Fragments, Department of Anthropology, Orgegon State University
  Edward Dutton, Sointula and the Seeds of Kalervo Oberg’s Culture Shock Model

Canadian anthropologists
Canadian people of Finnish descent
People from Nanaimo
1901 births
1973 deaths
20th-century anthropologists